The Ash Pit is an inactive volcanic crater, located in the Spectrum Range in British Columbia, Canada. It is Holocene in age and is considered the youngest feature in the Spectrum Range volcanic complex. It is within the Northern Cordilleran Volcanic Province and is part of the Pacific Ring of Fire, that includes over 160 active volcanoes.

See also
 List of volcanoes in Canada
 List of Northern Cordilleran volcanoes
 Volcanism of Canada
 Volcanism of Western Canada
 Volcanic history of the Northern Cordilleran Volcanic Province

References
 
 Catalogue of Canadian volcanoes: The Ash Pit

Volcanic craters
Mount Edziza volcanic complex
Holocene volcanoes
Inactive volcanoes